Oxyptilus chrysodactyla is a moth of the family Pterophoridae. It is found in most of Europe, except most of the Balkan Peninsula, Great Britain, Ireland and Portugal.

Adults are brown. The upperside of the wings is bright brownish with bright white bands. The underside of the wings are dark grey-brown, although they become lighter near the end. Adults are on wing from June to August. They fly during the day and at dusk.

The larvae feed on Hieracium umbellatum, Hieracium amplexicaule, Hieracium sabaudum and Picris hieracioides. They feed in the heart of their host plant and later spin the top-leaves together. Pupation occurs on the upper surface of a leaf or along the stem.

References

Oxyptilini
Moths described in 1775
Moths of Japan
Moths of Asia
Plume moths of Europe
Taxa named by Michael Denis
Taxa named by Ignaz Schiffermüller